Lorna de Smidt (1943–2022) was a South African-born activist.

Biography
Lorna de Smidt was born in 1943 in Kensington, Cape Town to parents of mixed ancestry. She was raised in Cape Town, South Africa. At the age of four, she was admitted in a primary school, named Trafalgar High School. She completed her graduation from Zonnebloem Teacher Training College in 1960 and subsequently became a teacher.

In the 1960s, as a part of the Black Consciousness Movement, she became an anti-apartheid activist.

In 1976, after Soweto riots she became a refugee in England and lived rest of her life there.

Between 1983 to 1991, de Smidt worked for the Lewisham Race Equality Unit.

From 2000 to 2005, she worked on a restoration project of South Africa House, at the South African Embassy, London.

She died in 2022.

Documentaries
 Suffer the Children (1988)
 How I'd Love to Feel Free (1989)

References

1943 births
2022 deaths
South African activists
South African women activists
People from Cape Town